Basílica de San Francisco may refer to:
Basilica of San Francisco el Grande, Madrid, Spain
Basilica of San Francisco, La Paz, Bolivia
Basílica Menor de San Francisco de Asís, Havana, Cuba

See also
Basilica of San Francesco (disambiguation)